

Hop-Hos

|- class="vcard"
| class="fn org" | Hopcroft's Holt
| class="adr" | Oxfordshire
| class="note" | 
| class="note" | 
|- class="vcard"
| class="fn org" | Hope
| class="adr" | Derbyshire
| class="note" | 
| class="note" | 
|- class="vcard"
| class="fn org" | Hope
| class="adr" | Flintshire
| class="note" | 
| class="note" | 
|- class="vcard"
| class="fn org" | Hope
| class="adr" | Staffordshire
| class="note" | 
| class="note" | 
|- class="vcard"
| class="fn org" | Hope
| class="adr" | Shropshire
| class="note" | 
| class="note" | 
|- class="vcard"
| class="fn org" | Hope Bagot
| class="adr" | Shropshire
| class="note" | 
| class="note" | 
|- class="vcard"
| class="fn org" | Hopebeck
| class="adr" | Cumbria
| class="note" | 
| class="note" | 
|- class="vcard"
| class="fn org" | Hope Bowdler
| class="adr" | Shropshire
| class="note" | 
| class="note" | 
|- class="vcard"
| class="fn org" | Hopedale
| class="adr" | Staffordshire
| class="note" | 
| class="note" | 
|- class="vcard"
| class="fn org" | Hope End Green
| class="adr" | Essex
| class="note" | 
| class="note" | 
|- class="vcard"
| class="fn org" | Hope Green
| class="adr" | Cheshire
| class="note" | 
| class="note" | 
|- class="vcard"
| class="fn org" | Hopeman
| class="adr" | Moray
| class="note" | 
| class="note" | 
|- class="vcard"
| class="fn org" | Hope Mansell
| class="adr" | Herefordshire
| class="note" | 
| class="note" | 
|- class="vcard"
| class="fn org" | Hope Park
| class="adr" | Shropshire
| class="note" | 
| class="note" | 
|- class="vcard"
| class="fn org" | Hopesay
| class="adr" | Shropshire
| class="note" | 
| class="note" | 
|- class="vcard"
| class="fn org" | Hopesgate
| class="adr" | Shropshire
| class="note" | 
| class="note" | 
|- class="vcard"
| class="fn org" | Hope's Green
| class="adr" | Essex
| class="note" | 
| class="note" | 
|- class="vcard"
| class="fn org" | Hope's Rough
| class="adr" | Herefordshire
| class="note" | 
| class="note" | 
|- class="vcard"
| class="fn org" | Hopetown
| class="adr" | Wakefield
| class="note" | 
| class="note" | 
|- class="vcard"
| class="fn org" | Hope under Dinmore
| class="adr" | Herefordshire
| class="note" | 
| class="note" | 
|- class="vcard"
| class="fn org" | Hopgoods Green
| class="adr" | Berkshire
| class="note" | 
| class="note" | 
|- class="vcard"
| class="fn org" | Hopkinstown
| class="adr" | Rhondda, Cynon, Taff
| class="note" | 
| class="note" | 
|- class="vcard"
| class="fn org" | Hopley's Green
| class="adr" | Herefordshire
| class="note" | 
| class="note" | 
|- class="vcard"
| class="fn org" | Hopperton
| class="adr" | North Yorkshire
| class="note" | 
| class="note" | 
|- class="vcard"
| class="fn org" | Hop Pole
| class="adr" | Lincolnshire
| class="note" | 
| class="note" | 
|- class="vcard"
| class="fn org" | Hopsford
| class="adr" | Warwickshire
| class="note" | 
| class="note" | 
|- class="vcard"
| class="fn org" | Hopstone
| class="adr" | Shropshire
| class="note" | 
| class="note" | 
|- class="vcard"
| class="fn org" | Hopton
| class="adr" | Derbyshire
| class="note" | 
| class="note" | 
|- class="vcard"
| class="fn org" | Hopton
| class="adr" | Shropshire
| class="note" | 
| class="note" | 
|- class="vcard"
| class="fn org" | Hopton
| class="adr" | Staffordshire
| class="note" | 
| class="note" | 
|- class="vcard"
| class="fn org" | Hopton
| class="adr" | Suffolk
| class="note" | 
| class="note" | 
|- class="vcard"
| class="fn org" | Hoptonbank
| class="adr" | Shropshire
| class="note" | 
| class="note" | 
|- class="vcard"
| class="fn org" | Hopton Cangeford
| class="adr" | Shropshire
| class="note" | 
| class="note" | 
|- class="vcard"
| class="fn org" | Hopton Castle
| class="adr" | Shropshire
| class="note" | 
| class="note" | 
|- class="vcard"
| class="fn org" | Hoptongate
| class="adr" | Shropshire
| class="note" | 
| class="note" | 
|- class="vcard"
| class="fn org" | Hopton Heath
| class="adr" | Shropshire
| class="note" | 
| class="note" | 
|- class="vcard"
| class="fn org" | Hopton Heath
| class="adr" | Staffordshire
| class="note" | 
| class="note" | 
|- class="vcard"
| class="fn org" | Hopton on Sea
| class="adr" | Norfolk
| class="note" | 
| class="note" | 
|- class="vcard"
| class="fn org" | Hopton Wafers
| class="adr" | Shropshire
| class="note" | 
| class="note" | 
|- class="vcard"
| class="fn org" | Hopwas
| class="adr" | Staffordshire
| class="note" | 
| class="note" | 
|- class="vcard"
| class="fn org" | Hopwood
| class="adr" | Worcestershire
| class="note" | 
| class="note" | 
|- class="vcard"
| class="fn org" | Hopwood
| class="adr" | Rochdale
| class="note" | 
| class="note" | 
|- class="vcard"
| class="fn org" | Hopworthy
| class="adr" | Devon
| class="note" | 
| class="note" | 
|- class="vcard"
| class="fn org" | Horam
| class="adr" | East Sussex
| class="note" | 
| class="note" | 
|- class="vcard"
| class="fn org" | Horbling
| class="adr" | Lincolnshire
| class="note" | 
| class="note" | 
|- class="vcard"
| class="fn org" | Horbury
| class="adr" | Wakefield
| class="note" | 
| class="note" | 
|- class="vcard"
| class="fn org" | Horbury Bridge
| class="adr" | Wakefield
| class="note" | 
| class="note" | 
|- class="vcard"
| class="fn org" | Horbury Junction
| class="adr" | Wakefield
| class="note" | 
| class="note" | 
|- class="vcard"
| class="fn org" | Horcott
| class="adr" | Gloucestershire
| class="note" | 
| class="note" | 
|- class="vcard"
| class="fn org" | Horden
| class="adr" | Durham
| class="note" | 
| class="note" | 
|- class="vcard"
| class="fn org" | Hordle
| class="adr" | Hampshire
| class="note" | 
| class="note" | 
|- class="vcard"
| class="fn org" | Hordley
| class="adr" | Shropshire
| class="note" | 
| class="note" | 
|- class="vcard"
| class="fn org" | Horeb
| class="adr" | Ceredigion
| class="note" | 
| class="note" | 
|- class="vcard"
| class="fn org" | Horeb (Llanegwad)
| class="adr" | Carmarthenshire
| class="note" | 
| class="note" | 
|- class="vcard"
| class="fn org" | Horeb (near Llanelli)
| class="adr" | Carmarthenshire
| class="note" | 
| class="note" | 
|- class="vcard"
| class="fn org" | Horeb
| class="adr" | Flintshire
| class="note" | 
| class="note" | 
|- class="vcard"
| class="fn org" | Horfield
| class="adr" | City of Bristol
| class="note" | 
| class="note" | 
|- class="vcard"
| class="fn org" | Horgabost
| class="adr" | Western Isles
| class="note" | 
| class="note" | 
|- class="vcard"
| class="fn org" | Horham
| class="adr" | Suffolk
| class="note" | 
| class="note" | 
|- class="vcard"
| class="fn org" | Horkstow
| class="adr" | North Lincolnshire
| class="note" | 
| class="note" | 
|- class="vcard"
| class="fn org" | Horkstow Wolds
| class="adr" | North Lincolnshire
| class="note" | 
| class="note" | 
|- class="vcard"
| class="fn org" | Horley
| class="adr" | Surrey
| class="note" | 
| class="note" | 
|- class="vcard"
| class="fn org" | Horley
| class="adr" | Oxfordshire
| class="note" | 
| class="note" | 
|- class="vcard"
| class="fn org" | Horn Ash
| class="adr" | Dorset
| class="note" | 
| class="note" | 
|- class="vcard"
| class="fn org" | Hornblotton
| class="adr" | Somerset
| class="note" | 
| class="note" | 
|- class="vcard"
| class="fn org" | Hornblotton Green
| class="adr" | Somerset
| class="note" | 
| class="note" | 
|- class="vcard"
| class="fn org" | Hornby
| class="adr" | Lancashire
| class="note" | 
| class="note" | 
|- class="vcard"
| class="fn org" | Hornby (Richmondshire)
| class="adr" | North Yorkshire
| class="note" | 
| class="note" | 
|- class="vcard"
| class="fn org" | Hornby (Hambleton)
| class="adr" | North Yorkshire
| class="note" | 
| class="note" | 
|- class="vcard"
| class="fn org" | Horncastle
| class="adr" | Berkshire
| class="note" | 
| class="note" | 
|- class="vcard"
| class="fn org" | Horncastle
| class="adr" | Lincolnshire
| class="note" | 
| class="note" | 
|- class="vcard"
| class="fn org" | Hornchurch
| class="adr" | Havering
| class="note" | 
| class="note" | 
|- class="vcard"
| class="fn org" | Horncliffe
| class="adr" | Northumberland
| class="note" | 
| class="note" | 
|- class="vcard"
| class="fn org" | Horndean
| class="adr" | Hampshire
| class="note" | 
| class="note" | 
|- class="vcard"
| class="fn org" | Horndean
| class="adr" | Scottish Borders
| class="note" | 
| class="note" | 
|- class="vcard"
| class="fn org" | Horndon
| class="adr" | Devon
| class="note" | 
| class="note" | 
|- class="vcard"
| class="fn org" | Horndon-on-the-Hill
| class="adr" | Essex
| class="note" | 
| class="note" | 
|- class="vcard"
| class="fn org" | Horne
| class="adr" | Surrey
| class="note" | 
| class="note" | 
|- class="vcard"
| class="fn org" | Horner
| class="adr" | Somerset
| class="note" | 
| class="note" | 
|- class="vcard"
| class="fn org" | Horne Row
| class="adr" | Essex
| class="note" | 
| class="note" | 
|- class="vcard"
| class="fn org" | Horner's Green
| class="adr" | Suffolk
| class="note" | 
| class="note" | 
|- class="vcard"
| class="fn org" | Hornestreet
| class="adr" | Essex
| class="note" | 
| class="note" | 
|- class="vcard"
| class="fn org" | Horneval
| class="adr" | Highland
| class="note" | 
| class="note" | 
|- class="vcard"
| class="fn org" | Horney Common
| class="adr" | East Sussex
| class="note" | 
| class="note" | 
|- class="vcard"
| class="fn org" | Horn Hill
| class="adr" | Somerset
| class="note" | 
| class="note" | 
|- class="vcard"
| class="fn org" | Hornick
| class="adr" | Cornwall
| class="note" | 
| class="note" | 
|- class="vcard"
| class="fn org" | Horning
| class="adr" | Norfolk
| class="note" | 
| class="note" | 
|- class="vcard"
| class="fn org" | Horninghold
| class="adr" | Leicestershire
| class="note" | 
| class="note" | 
|- class="vcard"
| class="fn org" | Horninglow
| class="adr" | Staffordshire
| class="note" | 
| class="note" | 
|- class="vcard"
| class="fn org" | Horningsea
| class="adr" | Cambridgeshire
| class="note" | 
| class="note" | 
|- class="vcard"
| class="fn org" | Horningsham
| class="adr" | Wiltshire
| class="note" | 
| class="note" | 
|- class="vcard"
| class="fn org" | Horningtoft
| class="adr" | Norfolk
| class="note" | 
| class="note" | 
|- class="vcard"
| class="fn org" | Horningtops
| class="adr" | Cornwall
| class="note" | 
| class="note" | 
|- class="vcard"
| class="fn org" | Horn Park
| class="adr" | Greenwich
| class="note" | 
| class="note" | 
|- class="vcard"
| class="fn org" | Hornsbury
| class="adr" | Somerset
| class="note" | 
| class="note" | 
|- class="vcard"
| class="fn org" | Hornsby
| class="adr" | Cumbria
| class="note" | 
| class="note" | 
|- class="vcard"
| class="fn org" | Horns Cross
| class="adr" | Devon
| class="note" | 
| class="note" | 
|- class="vcard"
| class="fn org" | Horns Cross
| class="adr" | East Sussex
| class="note" | 
| class="note" | 
|- class="vcard"
| class="fn org" | Hornsea
| class="adr" | East Riding of Yorkshire
| class="note" | 
| class="note" | 
|- class="vcard"
| class="fn org" | Hornsea Burton
| class="adr" | East Riding of Yorkshire
| class="note" | 
| class="note" | 
|- class="vcard"
| class="fn org" | Hornsey
| class="adr" | Haringey
| class="note" | 
| class="note" | 
|- class="vcard"
| class="fn org" | Hornsey Vale
| class="adr" | Haringey
| class="note" | 
| class="note" | 
|- class="vcard"
| class="fn org" | Horns Green
| class="adr" | Bromley
| class="note" | 
| class="note" | 
|- class="vcard"
| class="fn org" | Horn Street (Folkestone)
| class="adr" | Kent
| class="note" | 
| class="note" | 
|- class="vcard"
| class="fn org" | Horn Street (Birling)
| class="adr" | Kent
| class="note" | 
| class="note" | 
|- class="vcard"
| class="fn org" | Hornton
| class="adr" | Oxfordshire
| class="note" | 
| class="note" | 
|- class="vcard"
| class="fn org" | Horpit
| class="adr" | Swindon
| class="note" | 
| class="note" | 
|- class="vcard"
| class="fn org" | Horrabridge
| class="adr" | Devon
| class="note" | 
| class="note" | 
|- class="vcard"
| class="fn org" | Horringer
| class="adr" | Suffolk
| class="note" | 
| class="note" | 
|- class="vcard"
| class="fn org" | Horrocks Fold
| class="adr" | Bolton
| class="note" | 
| class="note" | 
|- class="vcard"
| class="fn org" | Horrocksford
| class="adr" | Lancashire
| class="note" | 
| class="note" | 
|- class="vcard"
| class="fn org" | Horsalls
| class="adr" | Kent
| class="note" | 
| class="note" | 
|- class="vcard"
| class="fn org" | Horsebridge
| class="adr" | Hampshire
| class="note" | 
| class="note" | 
|- class="vcard"
| class="fn org" | Horsebridge
| class="adr" | Devon
| class="note" | 
| class="note" | 
|- class="vcard"
| class="fn org" | Horse Bridge
| class="adr" | Staffordshire
| class="note" | 
| class="note" | 
|- class="vcard"
| class="fn org" | Horsebridge
| class="adr" | Shropshire
| class="note" | 
| class="note" | 
|- class="vcard"
| class="fn org" | Horsebrook
| class="adr" | Devon
| class="note" | 
| class="note" | 
|- class="vcard"
| class="fn org" | Horsebrook
| class="adr" | Staffordshire
| class="note" | 
| class="note" | 
|- class="vcard"
| class="fn org" | Horsecastle
| class="adr" | North Somerset
| class="note" | 
| class="note" | 
|- class="vcard"
| class="fn org" | Horsedown
| class="adr" | Wiltshire
| class="note" | 
| class="note" | 
|- class="vcard"
| class="fn org" | Horsedowns
| class="adr" | Cornwall
| class="note" | 
| class="note" | 
|- class="vcard"
| class="fn org" | Horsehay
| class="adr" | Shropshire
| class="note" | 
| class="note" | 
|- class="vcard"
| class="fn org" | Horseheath
| class="adr" | Cambridgeshire
| class="note" | 
| class="note" | 
|- class="vcard"
| class="fn org" | Horsehouse
| class="adr" | North Yorkshire
| class="note" | 
| class="note" | 
|- class="vcard"
| class="fn org" | Horse Island
| class="adr" | Shetland Islands
| class="note" | 
| class="note" | 
|- class="vcard"
| class="fn org" | Horse Island
| class="adr" | Highland
| class="note" | 
| class="note" | 
|- class="vcard"
| class="fn org" | Horseley Heath
| class="adr" | Sandwell
| class="note" | 
| class="note" | 
|- class="vcard"
| class="fn org" | Horsell
| class="adr" | Surrey
| class="note" | 
| class="note" | 
|- class="vcard"
| class="fn org" | Horsell Birch
| class="adr" | Surrey
| class="note" | 
| class="note" | 
|- class="vcard"
| class="fn org" | Horseman's Green
| class="adr" | Wrexham
| class="note" | 
| class="note" | 
|- class="vcard"
| class="fn org" | Horseman Side
| class="adr" | Essex
| class="note" | 
| class="note" | 
|- class="vcard"
| class="fn org" | Horsemere Green
| class="adr" | West Sussex
| class="note" | 
| class="note" | 
|- class="vcard"
| class="fn org" | Horsenden
| class="adr" | Buckinghamshire
| class="note" | 
| class="note" | 
|- class="vcard"
| class="fn org" | Horsepools
| class="adr" | Gloucestershire
| class="note" | 
| class="note" | 
|- class="vcard"
| class="fn org" | Horseway
| class="adr" | Cambridgeshire
| class="note" | 
| class="note" | 
|- class="vcard"
| class="fn org" | Horseway Head
| class="adr" | Herefordshire
| class="note" | 
| class="note" | 
|- class="vcard"
| class="fn org" | Horsey
| class="adr" | Somerset
| class="note" | 
| class="note" | 
|- class="vcard"
| class="fn org" | Horsey
| class="adr" | Norfolk
| class="note" | 
| class="note" | 
|- class="vcard"
| class="fn org" | Horsey Corner
| class="adr" | Norfolk
| class="note" | 
| class="note" | 
|- class="vcard"
| class="fn org" | Horsey Down
| class="adr" | Wiltshire
| class="note" | 
| class="note" | 
|- class="vcard"
| class="fn org" | Horsey Island
| class="adr" | Essex
| class="note" | 
| class="note" | 
|- class="vcard"
| class="fn org" | Horsford
| class="adr" | Norfolk
| class="note" | 
| class="note" | 
|- class="vcard"
| class="fn org" | Horsforth
| class="adr" | Leeds
| class="note" | 
| class="note" | 
|- class="vcard"
| class="fn org" | Horsforth Woodside
| class="adr" | Leeds
| class="note" | 
| class="note" | 
|- class="vcard"
| class="fn org" | Horsham
| class="adr" | West Sussex
| class="note" | 
| class="note" | 
|- class="vcard"
| class="fn org" | Horsham
| class="adr" | Worcestershire
| class="note" | 
| class="note" | 
|- class="vcard"
| class="fn org" | Horsham St Faith
| class="adr" | Norfolk
| class="note" | 
| class="note" | 
|- class="vcard"
| class="fn org" | Horshoe Green
| class="adr" | Kent
| class="note" | 
| class="note" | 
|- class="vcard"
| class="fn org" | Horsington
| class="adr" | Somerset
| class="note" | 
| class="note" | 
|- class="vcard"
| class="fn org" | Horsington
| class="adr" | Lincolnshire
| class="note" | 
| class="note" | 
|- class="vcard"
| class="fn org" | Horsley
| class="adr" | Gloucestershire
| class="note" | 
| class="note" | 
|- class="vcard"
| class="fn org" | Horsley (Hexham)
| class="adr" | Northumberland
| class="note" | 
| class="note" | 
|- class="vcard"
| class="fn org" | Horsley (Rochester)
| class="adr" | Northumberland
| class="note" | 
| class="note" | 
|- class="vcard"
| class="fn org" | Horsley
| class="adr" | Derbyshire
| class="note" | 
| class="note" | 
|- class="vcard"
| class="fn org" | Horsley Cross
| class="adr" | Essex
| class="note" | 
| class="note" | 
|- class="vcard"
| class="fn org" | Horsleycross Street
| class="adr" | Essex
| class="note" | 
| class="note" | 
|- class="vcard"
| class="fn org" | Horsleyhill
| class="adr" | Scottish Borders
| class="note" | 
| class="note" | 
|- class="vcard"
| class="fn org" | Horsley Hill
| class="adr" | South Tyneside
| class="note" | 
| class="note" | 
|- class="vcard"
| class="fn org" | Horsleyhope
| class="adr" | Durham
| class="note" | 
| class="note" | 
|- class="vcard"
| class="fn org" | Horsleys Green
| class="adr" | Buckinghamshire
| class="note" | 
| class="note" | 
|- class="vcard"
| class="fn org" | Horsley Woodhouse
| class="adr" | Derbyshire
| class="note" | 
| class="note" | 
|- class="vcard"
| class="fn org" | Horsmonden
| class="adr" | Kent
| class="note" | 
| class="note" | 
|- class="vcard"
| class="fn org" | Horspath
| class="adr" | Oxfordshire
| class="note" | 
| class="note" | 
|- class="vcard"
| class="fn org" | Horstead
| class="adr" | Norfolk
| class="note" | 
| class="note" | 
|- class="vcard"
| class="fn org" | Horsted Green
| class="adr" | East Sussex
| class="note" | 
| class="note" | 
|- class="vcard"
| class="fn org" | Horsted Keynes
| class="adr" | West Sussex
| class="note" | 
| class="note" | 
|- class="vcard"
| class="fn org" | Horton
| class="adr" | Berkshire
| class="note" | 
| class="note" | 
|- class="vcard"
| class="fn org" | Horton
| class="adr" | Buckinghamshire
| class="note" | 
| class="note" | 
|- class="vcard"
| class="fn org" | Horton
| class="adr" | Dorset
| class="note" | 
| class="note" | 
|- class="vcard"
| class="fn org" | Horton
| class="adr" | Kent
| class="note" | 
| class="note" | 
|- class="vcard"
| class="fn org" | Horton
| class="adr" | Lancashire
| class="note" | 
| class="note" | 
|- class="vcard"
| class="fn org" | Horton
| class="adr" | Northamptonshire
| class="note" | 
| class="note" | 
|- class="vcard"
| class="fn org" | Horton (Hadley)
| class="adr" | Shropshire
| class="note" | 
| class="note" | 
|- class="vcard"
| class="fn org" | Horton (Wem Rural)
| class="adr" | Shropshire
| class="note" | 
| class="note" | 
|- class="vcard"
| class="fn org" | Horton
| class="adr" | Somerset
| class="note" | 
| class="note" | 
|- class="vcard"
| class="fn org" | Horton
| class="adr" | South Gloucestershire
| class="note" | 
| class="note" | 
|- class="vcard"
| class="fn org" | Horton
| class="adr" | Staffordshire
| class="note" | 
| class="note" | 
|- class="vcard"
| class="fn org" | Horton
| class="adr" | Swansea
| class="note" | 
| class="note" | 
|- class="vcard"
| class="fn org" | Horton
| class="adr" | Wiltshire
| class="note" | 
| class="note" | 
|- class="vcard"
| class="fn org" | Horton Common
| class="adr" | Dorset
| class="note" | 
| class="note" | 
|- class="vcard"
| class="fn org" | Horton Cross
| class="adr" | Somerset
| class="note" | 
| class="note" | 
|- class="vcard"
| class="fn org" | Horton-cum-Studley
| class="adr" | Oxfordshire
| class="note" | 
| class="note" | 
|- class="vcard"
| class="fn org" | Horton Green
| class="adr" | Cheshire
| class="note" | 
| class="note" | 
|- class="vcard"
| class="fn org" | Horton Heath
| class="adr" | Dorset
| class="note" | 
| class="note" | 
|- class="vcard"
| class="fn org" | Horton Heath
| class="adr" | Hampshire
| class="note" | 
| class="note" | 
|- class="vcard"
| class="fn org" | Horton in Ribblesdale
| class="adr" | North Yorkshire
| class="note" | 
| class="note" | 
|- class="vcard"
| class="fn org" | Horton Kirby
| class="adr" | Kent
| class="note" | 
| class="note" | 
|- class="vcard"
| class="fn org" | Hortonlane
| class="adr" | Shropshire
| class="note" | 
| class="note" | 
|- class="vcard"
| class="fn org" | Horton Wharf
| class="adr" | Buckinghamshire
| class="note" | 
| class="note" | 
|- class="vcard"
| class="fn org" | Hortonwood
| class="adr" | Shropshire
| class="note" | 
| class="note" | 
|- class="vcard"
| class="fn org" | Horwich
| class="adr" | Bolton
| class="note" | 
| class="note" | 
|- class="vcard"
| class="fn org" | Horwich End
| class="adr" | Derbyshire
| class="note" | 
| class="note" | 
|- class="vcard"
| class="fn org" | Horwood
| class="adr" | Devon
| class="note" | 
| class="note" | 
|- class="vcard"
| class="fn org" | Horwood Riding
| class="adr" | South Gloucestershire
| class="note" | 
| class="note" | 
|- class="vcard"
| class="fn org" | Hoscar
| class="adr" | Lancashire
| class="note" | 
| class="note" | 
|- class="vcard"
| class="fn org" | Hose
| class="adr" | Leicestershire
| class="note" | 
| class="note" | 
|- class="vcard"
| class="fn org" | Hoselaw
| class="adr" | Scottish Borders
| class="note" | 
| class="note" | 
|- class="vcard"
| class="fn org" | Hosey Hill
| class="adr" | Kent
| class="note" | 
| class="note" | 
|- class="vcard"
| class="fn org" | Hosh
| class="adr" | Perth and Kinross
| class="note" | 
| class="note" | 
|- class="vcard"
| class="fn org" | Hosta
| class="adr" | Western Isles
| class="note" | 
| class="note" | 
|- class="vcard"
| class="fn org" | Hoswick
| class="adr" | Shetland Islands
| class="note" | 
| class="note" | 
|}

Hot-Hoy

|- class="vcard"
| class="fn org" | Hotham
| class="adr" | East Riding of Yorkshire
| class="note" | 
| class="note" | 
|- class="vcard"
| class="fn org" | Hothfield
| class="adr" | Kent
| class="note" | 
| class="note" | 
|- class="vcard"
| class="fn org" | Hotley Bottom
| class="adr" | Buckinghamshire
| class="note" | 
| class="note" | 
|- class="vcard"
| class="fn org" | Hoton
| class="adr" | Leicestershire
| class="note" | 
| class="note" | 
|- class="vcard"
| class="fn org" | Hotwells
| class="adr" | City of Bristol
| class="note" | 
| class="note" | 
|- class="vcard"
| class="fn org" | Houbie
| class="adr" | Shetland Islands
| class="note" | 
| class="note" | 
|- class="vcard"
| class="fn org" | Hough (Alderley Edge)
| class="adr" | Cheshire
| class="note" | 
| class="note" | 
|- class="vcard"
| class="fn org" | Hough (near Crewe)
| class="adr" | Cheshire
| class="note" | 
| class="note" | 
|- class="vcard"
| class="fn org" | Hough
| class="adr" | Argyll and Bute
| class="note" | 
| class="note" | 
|- class="vcard"
| class="fn org" | Hougham
| class="adr" | Lincolnshire
| class="note" | 
| class="note" | 
|- class="vcard"
| class="fn org" | Hougharry
| class="adr" | Western Isles
| class="note" | 
| class="note" | 
|- class="vcard"
| class="fn org" | Hough Green
| class="adr" | Knowsley
| class="note" | 
| class="note" | 
|- class="vcard"
| class="fn org" | Hough-on-the-Hill
| class="adr" | Lincolnshire
| class="note" | 
| class="note" | 
|- class="vcard"
| class="fn org" | Hough Side
| class="adr" | Leeds
| class="note" | 
| class="note" | 
|- class="vcard"
| class="fn org" | Houghton
| class="adr" | Cambridgeshire
| class="note" | 
| class="note" | 
|- class="vcard"
| class="fn org" | Houghton
| class="adr" | Cumbria
| class="note" | 
| class="note" | 
|- class="vcard"
| class="fn org" | Houghton
| class="adr" | East Riding of Yorkshire
| class="note" | 
| class="note" | 
|- class="vcard"
| class="fn org" | Houghton
| class="adr" | Hampshire
| class="note" | 
| class="note" | 
|- class="vcard"
| class="fn org" | Houghton
| class="adr" | Norfolk
| class="note" | 
| class="note" | 
|- class="vcard"
| class="fn org" | Houghton
| class="adr" | Northumberland
| class="note" | 
| class="note" | 
|- class="vcard"
| class="fn org" | Houghton
| class="adr" | Pembrokeshire
| class="note" | 
| class="note" | 
|- class="vcard"
| class="fn org" | Houghton
| class="adr" | West Sussex
| class="note" | 
| class="note" | 
|- class="vcard"
| class="fn org" | Houghton Bank
| class="adr" | Darlington
| class="note" | 
| class="note" | 
|- class="vcard"
| class="fn org" | Houghton Conquest
| class="adr" | Bedfordshire
| class="note" | 
| class="note" | 
|- class="vcard"
| class="fn org" | Houghton Green
| class="adr" | East Sussex
| class="note" | 
| class="note" | 
|- class="vcard"
| class="fn org" | Houghton Green
| class="adr" | Cheshire
| class="note" | 
| class="note" | 
|- class="vcard"
| class="fn org" | Houghton-le-Side
| class="adr" | Darlington
| class="note" | 
| class="note" | 
|- class="vcard"
| class="fn org" | Houghton-le-Spring
| class="adr" | Sunderland
| class="note" | 
| class="note" | 
|- class="vcard"
| class="fn org" | Houghton on the Hill
| class="adr" | Leicestershire
| class="note" | 
| class="note" | 
|- class="vcard"
| class="fn org" | Houghton Regis
| class="adr" | Bedfordshire
| class="note" | 
| class="note" | 
|- class="vcard"
| class="fn org" | Houghton St Giles
| class="adr" | Norfolk
| class="note" | 
| class="note" | 
|- class="vcard"
| class="fn org" | Houghwood
| class="adr" | St Helens
| class="note" | 
| class="note" | 
|- class="vcard"
| class="fn org" | Houlland (Scalloway)
| class="adr" | Shetland Islands
| class="note" | 
| class="note" | 
|- class="vcard"
| class="fn org" | Houlland (Sandwick)
| class="adr" | Shetland Islands
| class="note" | 
| class="note" | 
|- class="vcard"
| class="fn org" | Houlland (near Bixter)
| class="adr" | Shetland Islands
| class="note" | 
| class="note" | 
|- class="vcard"
| class="fn org" | Houlland (Yell)
| class="adr" | Shetland Islands
| class="note" | 
| class="note" | 
|- class="vcard"
| class="fn org" | Houlsyke
| class="adr" | North Yorkshire
| class="note" | 
| class="note" | 
|- class="vcard"
| class="fn org" | Hound
| class="adr" | Hampshire
| class="note" | 
| class="note" | 
|- class="vcard"
| class="fn org" | Hound Green
| class="adr" | Hampshire
| class="note" | 
| class="note" | 
|- class="vcard"
| class="fn org" | Hound Hill
| class="adr" | Dorset
| class="note" | 
| class="note" | 
|- class="vcard"
| class="fn org" | Houndmills
| class="adr" | Hampshire
| class="note" | 
| class="note" | 
|- class="vcard"
| class="fn org" | Houndscroft
| class="adr" | Gloucestershire
| class="note" | 
| class="note" | 
|- class="vcard"
| class="fn org" | Houndslow
| class="adr" | Scottish Borders
| class="note" | 
| class="note" | 
|- class="vcard"
| class="fn org" | Houndsmoor
| class="adr" | Somerset
| class="note" | 
| class="note" | 
|- class="vcard"
| class="fn org" | Houndstone
| class="adr" | Somerset
| class="note" | 
| class="note" | 
|- class="vcard"
| class="fn org" | Houndwood
| class="adr" | Scottish Borders
| class="note" | 
| class="note" | 
|- class="vcard"
| class="fn org" | Hounsdown
| class="adr" | Hampshire
| class="note" | 
| class="note" | 
|- class="vcard"
| class="fn org" | Hounsley Batch
| class="adr" | North Somerset
| class="note" | 
| class="note" | 
|- class="vcard"
| class="fn org" | Hounslow
| class="adr" | 
| class="note" | 
| class="note" | 
|- class="vcard"
| class="fn org" | Hounslow Green
| class="adr" | Essex
| class="note" | 
| class="note" | 
|- class="vcard"
| class="fn org" | Hounslow West
| class="adr" | Hounslow
| class="note" | 
| class="note" | 
|- class="vcard"
| class="fn org" | Hourston
| class="adr" | Orkney Islands
| class="note" | 
| class="note" | 
|- class="vcard"
| class="fn org" | Housabister
| class="adr" | Shetland Islands
| class="note" | 
| class="note" | 
|- class="vcard"
| class="fn org" | Housay
| class="adr" | Shetland Islands
| class="note" | 
| class="note" | 
|- class="vcard"
| class="fn org" | Houses Hill
| class="adr" | Kirklees
| class="note" | 
| class="note" | 
|- class="vcard"
| class="fn org" | Housetter
| class="adr" | Shetland Islands
| class="note" | 
| class="note" | 
|- class="vcard"
| class="fn org" | Housham Tye
| class="adr" | Essex
| class="note" | 
| class="note" | 
|- class="vcard"
| class="fn org" | Houss
| class="adr" | Shetland Islands
| class="note" | 
| class="note" | 
|- class="vcard"
| class="fn org" | Houston
| class="adr" | Renfrewshire
| class="note" | 
| class="note" | 
|- class="vcard"
| class="fn org" | Houstry
| class="adr" | Highland
| class="note" | 
| class="note" | 
|- class="vcard"
| class="fn org" | Houton
| class="adr" | Orkney Islands
| class="note" | 
| class="note" | 
|- class="vcard"
| class="fn org" | Hove
| class="adr" | Brighton and Hove
| class="note" | 
| class="note" | 
|- class="vcard"
| class="fn org" | Hove Edge
| class="adr" | Calderdale
| class="note" | 
| class="note" | 
|- class="vcard"
| class="fn org" | Hoveringham
| class="adr" | Nottinghamshire
| class="note" | 
| class="note" | 
|- class="vcard"
| class="fn org" | Hoveton
| class="adr" | Norfolk
| class="note" | 
| class="note" | 
|- class="vcard"
| class="fn org" | Hovingham
| class="adr" | North Yorkshire
| class="note" | 
| class="note" | 
|- class="vcard"
| class="fn org" | How
| class="adr" | Cumbria
| class="note" | 
| class="note" | 
|- class="vcard"
| class="fn org" | Howbeck Bank
| class="adr" | Cheshire
| class="note" | 
| class="note" | 
|- class="vcard"
| class="fn org" | Howbrook
| class="adr" | Barnsley
| class="note" | 
| class="note" | 
|- class="vcard"
| class="fn org" | Howbury
| class="adr" | Bexley
| class="note" | 
| class="note" | 
|- class="vcard"
| class="fn org" | How Caple
| class="adr" | Herefordshire
| class="note" | 
| class="note" | 
|- class="vcard"
| class="fn org" | Howden
| class="adr" | East Riding of Yorkshire
| class="note" | 
| class="note" | 
|- class="vcard"
| class="fn org" | Howden
| class="adr" | West Lothian
| class="note" | 
| class="note" | 
|- class="vcard"
| class="fn org" | Howden Clough
| class="adr" | Kirklees
| class="note" | 
| class="note" | 
|- class="vcard"
| class="fn org" | Howdendyke
| class="adr" | East Riding of Yorkshire
| class="note" | 
| class="note" | 
|- class="vcard"
| class="fn org" | Howden-le-Wear
| class="adr" | Durham
| class="note" | 
| class="note" | 
|- class="vcard"
| class="fn org" | Howdon
| class="adr" | North Tyneside
| class="note" | 
| class="note" | 
|- class="vcard"
| class="fn org" | Howdon Pans
| class="adr" | North Tyneside
| class="note" | 
| class="note" | 
|- class="vcard"
| class="fn org" | Howe
| class="adr" | Norfolk
| class="note" | 
| class="note" | 
|- class="vcard"
| class="fn org" | Howe
| class="adr" | North Yorkshire
| class="note" | 
| class="note" | 
|- class="vcard"
| class="fn org" | Howe Bridge
| class="adr" | Wigan
| class="note" | 
| class="note" | 
|- class="vcard"
| class="fn org" | Howegreen (Maldon)
| class="adr" | Essex
| class="note" | 
| class="note" | 
|- class="vcard"
| class="fn org" | Howe Green
| class="adr" | Warwickshire
| class="note" | 
| class="note" | 
|- class="vcard"
| class="fn org" | Howe Green (Uttlesford)
| class="adr" | Essex
| class="note" | 
| class="note" | 
|- class="vcard"
| class="fn org" | Howe Green (Chelmsford)
| class="adr" | Essex
| class="note" | 
| class="note" | 
|- class="vcard"
| class="fn org" | Howell
| class="adr" | Lincolnshire
| class="note" | 
| class="note" | 
|- class="vcard"
| class="fn org" | How End
| class="adr" | Bedfordshire
| class="note" | 
| class="note" | 
|- class="vcard"
| class="fn org" | Howe of Teuchar
| class="adr" | Aberdeenshire
| class="note" | 
| class="note" | 
|- class="vcard"
| class="fn org" | Howe Street (Chelmsford)
| class="adr" | Essex
| class="note" | 
| class="note" | 
|- class="vcard"
| class="fn org" | Howe Street (Braintree)
| class="adr" | Essex
| class="note" | 
| class="note" | 
|- class="vcard"
| class="fn org" | Howey
| class="adr" | Powys
| class="note" | 
| class="note" | 
|- class="vcard"
| class="fn org" | Howford (Ettrickbridge)
| class="adr" | Scottish Borders
| class="note" | 
| class="note" | 
|- class="vcard"
| class="fn org" | Howford (Innerleithen)
| class="adr" | Scottish Borders
| class="note" | 
| class="note" | 
|- class="vcard"
| class="fn org" | Howgate
| class="adr" | Cumbria
| class="note" | 
| class="note" | 
|- class="vcard"
| class="fn org" | Howgate
| class="adr" | Midlothian
| class="note" | 
| class="note" | 
|- class="vcard"
| class="fn org" | Howgill
| class="adr" | North Yorkshire
| class="note" | 
| class="note" | 
|- class="vcard"
| class="fn org" | Howgill
| class="adr" | Lancashire
| class="note" | 
| class="note" | 
|- class="vcard"
| class="fn org" | Howgill
| class="adr" | Cumbria
| class="note" | 
| class="note" | 
|- class="vcard"
| class="fn org" | How Green
| class="adr" | Kent
| class="note" | 
| class="note" | 
|- class="vcard"
| class="fn org" | How Hill
| class="adr" | Norfolk
| class="note" | 
| class="note" | 
|- class="vcard"
| class="fn org" | Howick
| class="adr" | Monmouthshire
| class="note" | 
| class="note" | 
|- class="vcard"
| class="fn org" | Howick
| class="adr" | Northumberland
| class="note" | 
| class="note" | 
|- class="vcard"
| class="fn org" | Howick Cross
| class="adr" | Lancashire
| class="note" | 
| class="note" | 
|- class="vcard"
| class="fn org" | Howle
| class="adr" | Shropshire
| class="note" | 
| class="note" | 
|- class="vcard"
| class="fn org" | Howleigh
| class="adr" | Somerset
| class="note" | 
| class="note" | 
|- class="vcard"
| class="fn org" | Howlett End
| class="adr" | Essex
| class="note" | 
| class="note" | 
|- class="vcard"
| class="fn org" | Howley
| class="adr" | Somerset
| class="note" | 
| class="note" | 
|- class="vcard"
| class="fn org" | Howley
| class="adr" | Gloucestershire
| class="note" | 
| class="note" | 
|- class="vcard"
| class="fn org" | Howley
| class="adr" | Cheshire
| class="note" | 
| class="note" | 
|- class="vcard"
| class="fn org" | Hownam
| class="adr" | Scottish Borders
| class="note" | 
| class="note" | 
|- class="vcard"
| class="fn org" | Howpasley
| class="adr" | Scottish Borders
| class="note" | 
| class="note" | 
|- class="vcard"
| class="fn org" | Howsen
| class="adr" | Worcestershire
| class="note" | 
| class="note" | 
|- class="vcard"
| class="fn org" | Howsham
| class="adr" | North Lincolnshire
| class="note" | 
| class="note" | 
|- class="vcard"
| class="fn org" | Howsham
| class="adr" | North Yorkshire
| class="note" | 
| class="note" | 
|- class="vcard"
| class="fn org" | Howtel
| class="adr" | Northumberland
| class="note" | 
| class="note" | 
|- class="vcard"
| class="fn org" | Howt Green
| class="adr" | Kent
| class="note" | 
| class="note" | 
|- class="vcard"
| class="fn org" | Howton
| class="adr" | Herefordshire
| class="note" | 
| class="note" | 
|- class="vcard"
| class="fn org" | Howtown
| class="adr" | Cumbria
| class="note" | 
| class="note" | 
|- class="vcard"
| class="fn org" | How Wood
| class="adr" | Hertfordshire
| class="note" | 
| class="note" | 
|- class="vcard"
| class="fn org" | Howwood
| class="adr" | Renfrewshire
| class="note" | 
| class="note" | 
|- class="vcard"
| class="fn org" | Hoxne
| class="adr" | Suffolk
| class="note" | 
| class="note" | 
|- class="vcard"
| class="fn org" | Hoxton
| class="adr" | Hackney
| class="note" | 
| class="note" | 
|- class="vcard"
| class="fn org" | Hoy
| class="adr" | Shetland Islands
| class="note" | 
| class="note" | 
|- class="vcard"
| class="fn org" | Hoy (island)
| class="adr" | Orkney Islands
| class="note" | 
| class="note" | 
|- class="vcard"
| class="fn org" | Hoy (hamlet)
| class="adr" | Orkney Islands
| class="note" | 
| class="note" | 
|- class="vcard"
| class="fn org" | Hoylake
| class="adr" | Wirral
| class="note" | 
| class="note" | 
|- class="vcard"
| class="fn org" | Hoyland
| class="adr" | Barnsley
| class="note" | 
| class="note" | 
|- class="vcard"
| class="fn org" | Hoyland Common
| class="adr" | Barnsley
| class="note" | 
| class="note" | 
|- class="vcard"
| class="fn org" | Hoylandswaine
| class="adr" | Barnsley
| class="note" | 
| class="note" | 
|- class="vcard"
| class="fn org" | Hoyle
| class="adr" | West Sussex
| class="note" | 
| class="note" | 
|- class="vcard"
| class="fn org" | Hoyle Mill
| class="adr" | Barnsley
| class="note" | 
| class="note" | 
|}